Jens Burman (born 16 August 1994) is a Swedish cross-country skier who competes internationally.

He competed for Sweden at the FIS Nordic World Ski Championships 2017 in Lahti, Finland.

Cross-country skiing results
All results are sourced from the International Ski Federation (FIS).

Olympic Games

Distance reduced to 30 km due to weather conditions.

World Championships

World Cup

Season standings

Individual podiums
1 podium – (1 )

References

External links

1994 births
Living people
Swedish male cross-country skiers
Cross-country skiers at the 2018 Winter Olympics
Cross-country skiers at the 2022 Winter Olympics
Olympic cross-country skiers of Sweden
Tour de Ski skiers
People from Östersund